Jaroslav Feistauer (born 12 May 1909, date of death unknown) was a Czech cross-country skier. He competed in the men's 18 kilometre event at the 1932 Winter Olympics.

References

External links
 

1909 births
Year of death missing
People from Jablonec nad Nisou District
People from the Kingdom of Bohemia
Czech male cross-country skiers
Czech male Nordic combined skiers
Czech male ski jumpers
Olympic cross-country skiers of Czechoslovakia
Olympic Nordic combined skiers of Czechoslovakia
Olympic ski jumpers of Czechoslovakia
Cross-country skiers at the 1932 Winter Olympics
Nordic combined skiers at the 1932 Winter Olympics
Ski jumpers at the 1932 Winter Olympics
Sportspeople from the Liberec Region